Lepel (English translation: Spoon) is a 2005 Dutch children's film. The film received a Golden Film for 100,000 visitors.

References

 Britannica, The Editors of Encyclopaedia. "Spoon". Encyclopædia Britannica, 4 June 2019, https://www.britannica.com/topic/spoon-utensil. Accessed 21 May 2021.

External links

2000s Dutch-language films
2005 films
Dutch children's films